The Cleaving in Sunder  (al-infiṭār, also known as "The Cleaving" and "Bursting Apart") is the 82nd sura of the Qur'an, with 19 ayat. The chapter is named 'Al-Infitar' because of the occurrence of the word 'unfatarat' in the first verse of this chapter. Infitar means 'split asunder': the word 'Unfatarat' is used in this chapter in order to describe the splitting of the sky on the day of Judgment. This chapter (Al-Infitar), along with chapters At-Takwir and Al-Inshiqaq, provides an exhaustive description about the 'Day of Judgment'.

Summary
1-5 Signs of the judgment-day
6-9 Astonishing unbelief of man in his Creator
10-12 Guardian angels record the deeds of men
13-16 In the judgment the righteous shall be rewarded and the wicked punished
17-19 On the day of judgment there shall be no intercessor

Hadith
The first and foremost exegesis/tafsir of the Qur'an is found in hadith of prophet Muhammad. Although scholars including ibn Taymiyyah claim that Muhammad has commented on the whole of the Qur'an, others including Ghazali cite the limited amount of narratives, thus indicating that he has commented only on a portion of the Qur'an. Ḥadīth (حديث) is literally "speech" or "report", that is a recorded saying or tradition of Muhammad validated by isnad; with Sirah Rasul Allah these comprise the sunnah and reveal shariah. According to Aishah, the life of Prophet Muhammad was practical implementation of Qur'an. Therefore, mention in hadith elevates the importance of the pertinent surah from a certain perspective. 
 Imam Ahmad recorded from Ibn Umar that the Messenger of Allah said: "Whoever wishes to look at the Day of Resurrection, as if he is seeing it with this eye, then let him recite: 'When the sun Kuwwirat' (At-Takwir) and 'When the heaven is cleft sunder (Al-Infitar) and 'When the heaven is split asunder (Al-Inshiqaq)'."

 It was narrated that Jabir said: "Muadh stood up and prayed Isha', and made it lengthy. The Prophet (ﷺ) said: 'Do you want to cause hardship to the people, O Mu'adh; do you want to cause hardship to the people O Mu'adh? Why didn't you recite 'Glorify the Name of your Lord Most High' (Al-Ala or Ad-Dhuha) or 'When the heaven is cleft asunder' (Al-Infitar)?"

References

External links 
Omar Hisham Al Arabi Recitation of Surah Al Infitar HD سورة الانفطار
Quran 82 Clear Quran translation

Infitar